Flag officers of the Kriegsmarine were the leadership of the German Navy (known then as the "Kriegsmarine") from 1935 to 1945.  Most flag officers had also served as officers of the Reichsmarine, as well as the Imperial German Navy during World War I.  German naval flag officers were divided into five Admiralty ranks while a senior captain rank, known as Kommodore also existed.  The Kriegsmarine flag officers were responsible for holding the senior most naval positions within the organization of the Kriegsmarine.

Grand admirals

General admirals

Admirals

Vice admirals

Rear admirals

See also
List of German admirals

References

Bibliography
 Lohmann W. & Hildebrand H., Die Deutsche Kriegsmarine, Verlag Hans-Henning Podzun, Bad Nauheim (1956)
 Goerlitz, Walter. History of the German General Staff, 1657–1945. Boulder and London: Westview Press (1985)

Notes

Kriegsmarine